19-Norcholestane is a 26-carbon (C26) sterane.

See also 
 19-Norpregnane
 Cholestane
 Nor-

References 

Steroids